A maritime disaster is a disaster that occurs at sea, such as a ship sinking or foundering to the point of causing the death of many of its occupants. Many maritime disasters happen other than as a result of war. All ships, including those of the military, are vulnerable to problems from weather conditions, faulty design or human error. Some of the disasters below occurred during periods of conflict, although their losses were unrelated to any military action. The table listings are in decreasing order of the magnitude of casualties.

Non-combat disasters

Many maritime disasters happen outside the realms of war. All ships, including those of the military, are vulnerable to problems from weather conditions, faulty design or human error. Some of the disasters below occurred in periods of conflict, although their losses were unrelated to any military action. The table listings are in descending order of the magnitude of casualties suffered.

Wartime disasters

Disasters with high losses of life can occur in times of armed conflict. Shown below are some of the known events with major losses.

See also
 List of maritime disasters
 List of maritime disasters in the 19th century
 List of maritime disasters in the 20th century
 List of maritime disasters in World War I
 List of maritime disasters in World War II
 List of maritime disasters in the 21st century
 Shipwreck
 List of shipwrecks
 List of disasters
 List of accidents and disasters by death toll
 List by death toll of ships sunk by submarines
 List of RORO vessel accidents

References

Lists of shipwrecks
18th century-related lists